Scrobipalpa forsteri is a moth in the family Gelechiidae. It was described by Povolný in 1971. It is found in Tunisia.

The forewings are clay to coffee brown with a narrow dark brown to blackish axial line. The hindwings are dirty white.

References

Scrobipalpa
Moths described in 1971